Estonian Powerboating Union (abbreviation EPU) is one of the sport governing bodies in Estonia which deals with powerboating.

EPU is the legal successor of Estonian SSR Water Motorsport Federation which was established on 15 May 1956. EPU is a member of Union Internationale Motonautique (UIM) and Estonian Olympic Committee.

References

External links
 

Sports governing bodies in Estonia
Motorsport in Estonia